William Austin Lyon (January 21, 1903 – March 18, 1974) was an American film editor, from 1935 to 1971.
He was born in Texas, and died in Los Angeles, California. Employed by Columbia Pictures for most of his career, he was nominated for the Academy Award for Best Film Editing six times, and won twice, for From Here to Eternity (1953) and Picnic (1955).

Selected filmography
Restless Knights (1935)
 Code of the Range (1936)
 Two-Fisted Sheriff (1937)
 Two Gun Law (1937)
 Outlaws of the Prairie (1937)
 Rio Grande (1938)
 South of Arizona (1938)
 The Colorado Trail (1938)
 West of Cheyenne (1938)
 Call of the Rockies (1938)
 The Thundering West (1939)
 Texas Stampede (1939)
 Scandal Sheet (1939)
 Tramp, Tramp, Tramp (1942)
The Jolson Story (1946)
 Mr. District Attorney (1947)
Cargo to Capetown (1950) 
Death of a Salesman (1951)
From Here to Eternity (1953)
The Caine Mutiny (1954)
The Long Gray Line (1955)
Picnic (1955)
Cowboy (1958)
A Raisin in the Sun (1961)
The Secret of Santa Vittoria (1969; co-nominated with Earle Herdan)

References

External links

1903 births
1974 deaths
American film editors
Best Film Editing Academy Award winners